Andrzej Zebrzydowski, (1496 in Więcbork – 23 May 1560 in Września), Radwan coat of arms, was a Polish Roman Catholic bishop of Kamieniec Podolski (from 1543), Chełm (from 1545), Włocławek (from 1546) and Kraków (from 25 February 1551); chaplain of Bona Sforza, then supporter of Sigismund II Augustus.

See also
 List of Roman Catholic bishops of Kraków

References
 

Ecclesiastical senators of the Polish–Lithuanian Commonwealth
1496 births
1560 deaths
Bishops of Kraków
Bishops of Kujawy and Włocławek
Canons of Kraków
Andrzej